Limmat may refer to:
 Limmat, a river in the cantons of Zürich and Aargau in Switzerland.
 Limmat (ship, 1958), a tour boat provided by the Zürichsee-Schifffahrtsgesellschaft in Zürich.
 Limmatauen, a protected area at the Werdinsel Limmat river island.
 Limmatquai, a street in Zürich.
 Limmat Verlag, a publishing house in Zürich.